Parliamentary elections were held in Bulgaria between 30 September and 7 October 1879. The result was a victory for the Liberal Party, which won 140 of the 170 seats. Voter turnout was 32.0%.

Results

References

Bulgaria
1879 in Bulgaria
Parliamentary elections in Bulgaria
September 1879 events
October 1879 events